Thomas William Brooks (born 2 February 1948) is an English former professional footballer who made 113 appearances in the Football League playing for Lincoln City. He played as a defender.

Brooks was born in Wallsend, which was then in Northumberland. He was an apprentice with Lincoln City before making his debut on 10 April 1965 in a 2–0 win against Darlington in the Football League Fourth Division. He scored only once in a six-year career with the club, "a ferocious 30-yard drive" to give Lincoln a 2–0 lead away at Brentford in April 1968. He finished his league career in 1971 after 120 appearances in senior competition.

References

1948 births
Living people
Sportspeople from Wallsend
Footballers from Tyne and Wear
English footballers
Association football defenders
Lincoln City F.C. players
English Football League players